The Scots International Church or the Scottish Church  is located in Rotterdam, The Netherlands. An English-language Protestant church in the Presbyterian tradition, it is part of the Church of Scotland, within the Church's Presbytery of Europe.

History

The church was first built in 1643 for the many Scottish merchants, sailors and soldiers who lived in Rotterdam, and was built on behalf of the city. The first Scottish minister was Alexander Petrie, who travelled from Perth in Scotland to take up his position. The Fasti Ecclesiae Scoticanae (1928) states:
The Scottish Church at Rotterdam is one of the most interesting on the Continent. It was founded on 13 September 1643 with Alexander Petrie for its first minister, and, placed officially under the care of the Dutch Classis was accorded all the privileges of the Dutch Church, with full liberty to observe Scottish use and wont for worship. It was the central place of worship for the Scottish Brigade, consisting of three regiments, raised in 1572 for service in the Netherlands under the Earl of Leicester, and left by him there when he returned to England. For over two centuries these regiments aided the States General in their wars with Spain and France. They were always recruited from Scotland, and in 1688, as the earliest standing army in Europe, they formed the nucleus of William the Third's forces. The regimental chaplains were associated with the ministers of this congregation, and, until 1815, the church supported in Rotterdam, the Scottish Poorhouse, on the Schotsche dijk (now Schiedamsche dijk), for the education of orphan children of soldiers, and as a means of dispensing charity to invalided pensioners. The first meeting-place was a house in the Wynstraat, granted by the magistrates. In 1662 the congregation had the use of the ancient chapel of St Sebastian (demolished in 1910) in the Lombardstraat. Here ordination services, forbidden at home, were held by the banished Presbyters during the days of the Covenant. Amongst others, Richard Cameron was set apart to the ministry by Brown of Wamphray and Robert MacWard who (with his hand still upon Cameron's head) is said to have uttered the prophecy, fulfilled within a year: "Here is the head of a faithful minister and servant of Jesus Christ, who shall lose the same for his Master's interest." Colonel Wallace, the leader of the Pentland Rising, was an elder for a considerable time, and Sir Robert Hamilton, leader at Bothwell Bridge, was a communicant. On 13 December 1695, there was laid the foundation of a new church, which was opened in October 1697 by Robert Fleming the younger. All the stone-work was brought from Pittenweem and Queensferry. In 1894 this building underwent a complete renovation. It contains many interesting memorials, and has some valuable communion plate. The ancient pulpit of St Sebastian's has been preserved. The early records of the congregation are extant.

In 1722 the church was extended with a special almshouse for widows and orphans of fallen Scots soldiers.

The 17th-century church was destroyed in the 1940 bombing of Rotterdam. The current building in the Schiedamsevest dates from 1952 and was designed by M. C. A. Meischke.

See also
English Reformed Church, Amsterdam
St Mary's Church, Rotterdam, Anglican church in Delfshaven

References
Citations

Sources

External links
Scots International Church Rotterdam

Churches in Rotterdam
Church of Scotland churches
1643 in Scotland
1643 establishments in Europe
1643 in Christianity